Jeremy Gregory is a South-African born, Australian singer and musician. He has recorded with Australian bands The Rockmelons and Disco Montego, co-written minor commercial hits including "Let It Go" by Will Young, as well as performing his own work "That's What's Going Down", which was in the Australian Top 40 singles charts for three weeks, peaking at #31. , Gregory is a member of the Australian band Village Kid.

Discography

As lead artist

References

External links 

  Jeremy Gregory at Opera Bar

Australian singer-songwriters
South African emigrants to Australia
Living people
Year of birth missing (living people)